The 36th Meijin began league play on 2 December 2010 and concluded in October 2011. The defending champion was Iyama Yuta.

Preliminary tournament
The preliminary tournament started on 5 August 2010. Takao Shinji, Cho U, Yuki Satoshi, Sakai Hideyuki, Mizokami Tomochika, and Cho Chikun retained their places in the league from the 35th Meijin. These players were joined by the winners of the preliminary tournament: Yamashita Keigo, Hane Naoki, and Rin Kanketsu.

League play
League play commenced on 2 December 2010 after the preliminaries. The winner of the league was Keigo Yamashita. Hideyuki Sakai, Cho Chikun, and Rin Kanketsu were eliminated from the league.

Finals

References

2011 in go
Go competitions in Japan